Taylor Airport  is a privately owned, public use airport located three nautical miles (6 km) northeast of the central business district of Quinlan, a city in Hunt County, Texas, United States.

Facilities 
The Taylor Airport resides at an elevation of 473 feet (144 m) above mean sea level.

References 

www.t14airport.com

External links 
 Aerial image as of February 1995 from USGS The National Map
 

Airports in Texas
Transportation in Hunt County, Texas